The BYU women's volleyball program began its first year in 1969. The current coach is Heather Olmstead who is in her ninth season coaching the BYU Cougars women's volleyball team. To see the current season visit 2023 BYU Cougars women's volleyball team.

History
Since the BYU Women's Volleyball team has started in 1969 it has made 32 of 39 NCAA women's volleyball tournament appearances as of the 2019 Tournament. BYU has also made the postseason 42 years out of 51 years as of the 2019 Tournament. BYU has only had six head coaches since its first season in 1969.

Results by season

References

 
West Coast Conference volleyball
Volleyball clubs established in 1969
1969 establishments in Utah